Kuttippuram is a town in Kerala, India. It may also refer to:
 Kuttippuram Block Panchayat, a Block Panchayat in Kerala
 Kuttippuram (State Assembly constituency), a defunct constituency in Kerala
 Kuttippuram railway station, a Railway Station in Kerala
 Kuttippuram bridge, a Road Bridge in Kerala